Wayne Ferreira defeated Todd Woodbridge in the final, 6–2, 6–4 to win the men's singles tennis title at the 1996 Canadian Open.

Andre Agassi was the two-time reigning champion, but did not compete that year.

Seeds
A champion seed is indicated in bold text while text in italics indicates the round in which that seed was eliminated.  The top eight seeds received a bye to the second round.

Draw

Finals

Top half

Section 1

Section 2

Bottom half

Section 3

Section 4

External links
 1996 du Maurier Open draw

Singles